Thạch Thu Thảo (born 13 August 2001) is a Vietnamese model and beauty pageant titleholder. She placed 2nd Runner-Up at Miss Ethnic Vietnam 2022 and was later appointed as Miss Earth Vietnam 2022. She represented Vietnam at the Miss Earth 2022 pageant and placed at the Top 20.

Early life and education
Thu Thảo was born and raised in Trà Vinh and is a member of Vietnam's ethnic Khmer Krom minority. She is also a student at South Can Tho University.

Pageantry

Miss South Can Tho University 2021
In 2021, she participated in the Miss South Can Tho University pageant and excellently crowned the highest position overall.

Miss Universe Vietnam 2022
In 2022, she registered to compete in the 5th season of Miss Universe Vietnam and ended in 71st place.

Miss Ethnic Vietnam 2022
After stopping at the Top 71 Miss Universe Vietnam 2022, she continued to register for the Miss Ethnic Vietnam 2022 contest, finally she was crowned the 2nd runner-up and received the sub-award of Miss Ethnic Fashion.

Miss Earth 2022
During the press conference of Nova Entertainment Company about hosting the Miss Earth 2023 contest in Nha Trang, Vietnam, Thu Thao was announced to be the next representative of Vietnam at Miss Earth 2022, which was presented held in the Philippines. In the final show, she placed Top 20.

References

External links

Living people
Vietnamese female models
Miss Earth 2022 contestants
People from Trà Vinh province
2001 births